Janet Roitman is an American anthropologist. She is a professor of anthropology at the New School for Social Research in New York City. She was previously a research fellow with the Centre National de la Recherche Scientifique (CNRS), a member of the Institut Marcel-Mauss (CNRS-EHESS, GSPM) in Paris, and an instructor at the Fondation Nationale des Sciences Politiques de Paris.

Professor Roitman has conducted extensive research in Central Africa, focusing specifically on the borders of Cameroon, Nigeria, the Central African Republic and Chad. Her book, Fiscal Disobedience: An Anthropology of Economic Regulation in Central Africa (Princeton University Press, 2005), is an analysis of the unregulated commerce that transpires on those borders.  This research inquires into emergent forms of economic regulation in the region of the Chad Basin and considers consequential transformations in the nature of fiscal relations and citizenship.  More generally, her research covers topics of political economy, the anthropology of value, economization, and emergent forms of the political.

Her second book, “Anti-Crisis” (Duke University Press) inquires into the status of the concept of crisis in the social sciences.

Notes

Select publications
"The Right to Tax: Economic Citizenship in the Chad Basin," in Citizenship Studies, 2007.
"The Ethics of Illegality in the Chad Basin," in Comaroff and Comaroff, eds., Law and Disorder in the Postcolony. Chicago, IL.: University of Chicago Press, 2006.
Fiscal Disobedience: An Anthropology of Economic Regulation in Central Africa. New York, NY: Princeton University Press, 2005.
"Modes of Governing: the Garrison-Entrepôt," in Collier and Ong, eds., Global Assemblages: Technology, Governmentality, Ethics. Malden, MA: Blackwell, 2004.

External links
 https://www.newschool.edu/nssr/faculty/Janet-Roitman/

Year of birth missing (living people)
Living people
American anthropologists
University of Pennsylvania alumni
American women anthropologists